The Punishment of Burning in the Hand Act 1799 was an Act of the Parliament of Great Britain, that was issued as chapter 45 of the 39th year of George III. It continued and made perpetual an Act from 20 years earlier that provided for such punishment for felons who were convicted within benefit of clergy.

References

Great Britain Acts of Parliament 1799